Living in the Age of Airplanes (Original Motion Picture Soundtrack) is the soundtrack album to the 2015 American experimental documentary film of the Living in the Age of Airplanes. The documentary, narrated by Harrison Ford and written by a team led by producer-director Brian J. Terwilliger, featured musical score composed by James Horner. It was Horner's last film he scored, before his death in a plane crash in June 2015. The score released through digital download and streaming on September 14, 2016, and the physical format of the soundtrack was marketed by Intrada Records, which released in CDs in August 2017. Horner's score received appreciation from critics and had garnered awards posthumously, for his work in the film.

Production 
Terwilliger wanted an A-list narrator and score composer for the film, and wanted the narrator to have experience with aviation. Harrison Ford, who is also a pilot, recognized Terwilliger from One Six Right and accepted his offer to narrate the film, which was done over three days in early 2014. Ford narrated the entire rough cut of the film, watching it five times to "get into the character". James Horner befriended Terwilliger in 2008 while meeting at an air show; he agreed to compose the score. His goal was to give the score a spiritual feeling to match the film's tone, thus employing the world music genre. The score mostly consists of major-key harmonies, with "History of Transportation" and "Exponential Progress" being the only minor ones. "Nearly Perfected" features an orchestra. It is observed while the score has its Horner charm, there is an unexpected, soft theme in certain tracks that is reminiscent to the works of Thomas Newman. Horner thought the score marries together aviation and music. The score was performed by the Slovak National Symphony Orchestra at the Slovak Radio Concert Hall and some parts were recorded at the AIR Lyndhurst Hall.

Release 
The film's score was released as a soundtrack album, on September 14, 2016, the same day, coinciding with the streaming and home video release. It was distributed to Apple Music, where it was remastered by Peter Doell. That same day, it was released on Amazon in MP3 format. Four days prior, Terwilliger announced he was discussing a physical release of between 3,000 and 5,000 copies with several record labels, and finally chose Intrada Records to distribute the soundtrack album. It was released on CD as catalog number ISC401 on August 23, 2017, via Amazon.com as well as their official website. The CD contains liner notes from Terwilliger. Music tracks that were licensed from external sources were omitted form the album.

Track list

Critical reception 
Horner's score received universal acclaim for its ambiance and rich tone; Hickman Luke of said it is better than most film scores. James Southall of Movie Wave, noted: While it was said to be "a bit schmaltzy", it is spirited and makes a "lovely" album. Reviewing the score, Pacific Science Center based Philip Cosand, said "Home" is excessively dramatic but that it is appropriate in the context of an emotional scene. The score was considered a good representation of Horner's style but its relative brevity compared to his other works was noted. Nils Jacob Holt Hanssen of Celluloid Tunes called "History of Transportation" the best track, with "The Golden Age is Now" being the runner-up, and "Flowers" being the most atypical and humorous. The film's sound design was praised for its clarity, nuance, and balance. HuffPost said Horner "likened his approach ... to that of a painter, with the film serving as the canvas and musical color being used to describe and support the story's emotional dynamics". Scheib and Eagan, however, panned the score as excessive.

Accolades

References

External links 

 

2016 soundtrack albums
Film scores
James Horner albums
Intrada Records soundtracks
Documentary film soundtracks